The Ceres Connection is a cooperative program between MIT's Lincoln Laboratory and the Society for Science and the Public dedicated to promoting science education. It names asteroids discovered under the LINEAR project after teachers and contesting students who performed outstandingly in the following Society for Science and the Public competitions: the Discovery Channel Young Scientist Challenge, the Intel Science Talent Search, the Intel International Science and Engineering Fair.

Since 2002, over 200 asteroids are named each year through this program.

See also
Naming of asteroids
Lincoln Near-Earth Asteroid Research
Society for Science and the Public

External links
Official page

Asteroids
Science competitions